In the United States, a seller disclosure statement is a form disclosing the seller's knowledge of the condition of the property. The seller disclosure notice or statement is anecdotal and does not serve as a substitute for any inspections or warranties the purchaser may wish to obtain. It also does not serve as a warranty of any kind. Deliberate misrepresentation in the statement can result in liability. Seller disclosure statements are not compulsory in New Mexico.

See also
Caveat emptor

References

External links 
 Federal Rules of Civil Procedure: Depositions and Discovery

Real estate in the United States
Discovery (law)